48th Brigade or 48th Infantry Brigade may refer to:

 48th Indian Infantry Brigade
 48th Brigade (United Kingdom)
 48th Chemical Brigade (United States) 
 48th Infantry Brigade Combat Team (United States)

See also

 48th Division (disambiguation)